English singer Zayn Malik has garnered numerous awards and nominations throughout his career, which began in 2010 through the formation of the boy band One Direction. Malik received two Pop Awards at the BMI London Awards for co-writing the band's songs "Story of My Life" and "Night Changes". He left the group in 2015 and signed a solo record deal with RCA Records. 

In 2016, Malik released his debut solo studio album, Mind of Mine, which was preceded by two singles, "Pillowtalk" and "Like I Would". The former won the Pop Award at the 2017 BMI London Awards and received the Popjustice £20 Music Prize. It also received several nominations, including British Single of the Year and British Video of the Year at the 2017 Brit Awards and Favorite Song at the 43rd People's Choice Awards. "Like I Would" was nominated for Choice Music – Summer Song at the 2016 Teen Choice Awards. Malik received eight other nominations in that year's Teen Choice Awards, winning Choice Music – Breakout Artist and Choice Summer Music Star: Male. He was also awarded New Artist of the Year at the 2016 American Music Awards.

Malik collaborated with American singer-songwriter Taylor Swift for the song "I Don't Wanna Live Forever", which was included on the soundtrack to the 2017 film Fifty Shades Darker. It won awards at the 2018 BMI Pop Awards, iHeartRadio Titanium Awards, and MTV's Millennial Awards and Video Music Awards. In 2018, Malik's single "Dusk Till Dawn", which features Australian singer-songwriter Sia, was nominated for Best International Song at the LOS40 Music Awards. The following year, Malik's cover of "A Whole New World" with Zhavia Ward won Choice Song From A Movie at the 2019 Teen Choice Awards. In 2020, a remix of Shaed's "Trampoline" featuring Malik won Best Remix at the iHeartRadio Music Awards.

Awards and nominations

Notes

References

External links
 

Malik, Zayn
Awards and nominations